Access MicrOpay is a supplier of integrated payroll and Human Capital Management people management software and services to Australian and New Zealand businesses.

The company is a wholly owned subsidiary of The Access Group.

History 
MicrOpay was established in 1985 to provide payroll and human capital management technology to businesses in Australia.

The company was later purchased by the Commonwealth Bank in 1995, making it wholly owned by a major financial institution.

In April 2002, MicrOpay was acquired by the large South African based accounting software vendor, Softline. Softline had been well known for its earlier acquisition of international financial suite Accpac, formerly owned by Computer Associates. MicrOpay joined Softline's other Australian purchases, HandiSoft and Sybiz.

Softline was itself acquired in November 2003 by the Sage Group, an FTSE 100 company with over 6 million customers and more than 12,600 employees worldwide.

In 2006, MicrOpay acquired payroll and HR software provider Australian Flagship; who develop and market the Wage Easy payroll system.

During 2021, The Access Group purchased the APAC operations of several Sage Group products, including MicrOpay.

Operations 
In Australia, Access MicrOpay is one of the largest payroll and HR vendors with a client base in excess of 6,000 enterprises across all sectors.

The company's Head Office is based in Sydney with offices in Melbourne, and Perth.

Software products and services 
 MicrOpay
 MicrOpay (ESP)
 Wage Easy
 Payroll Online
 Business Intelligence

Services:
 Hosting
Recruitment
 Training
 Printed Products
 Data Care
 Consulting
 Payroll and HR Outsourcing

Primary competition 
 PayPac
 ADP
 HR3
 Elmo
 Intuit Online Payroll
 SurePayroll

References 

Payroll
Financial services companies established in 1985
Financial services companies based in Sydney
1985 establishments in Australia
Online financial services companies of Australia